Broken English is a 1996 New Zealand romantic drama film. Directed by Gregor Nicholas, it stars Aleksandra Vujčić, Julian Arahanga, Marton Csokas, and Rade Šerbedžija.

Synopsis
Nina is the daughter of Ivan, a fierce Croatian patriarch whose family immigrated to Auckland, New Zealand to escape the war. She works as a waitress in a restaurant and falls in love with Eddie, a Māori chef, despite her father's objections. For a price, she agrees to marry a Chinese co-worker so that he (and his Chinese wife) can establish permanent residency. The money gives her the independence she needs to leave her parents' house and move in with Eddie. Complications arise when Eddie realises the depth of her father's fury and the strength of Nina's family ties.

Cast
 Aleksandra Vujčić as Nina
 Julian Arahanga as Eddie
 Rade Šerbedžija as Ivan
 Marton Csokas as Darko
 Madeline McNamara as Mira
 Jing Zhao as Clara
 Li Yang as Wu
 Elizabeth Mavric as Vanya

Production
Aleksandra Vujčić had never acted before and was discovered in an Auckland bar.

NC-17 rating
On September 20, 1996, Broken English received an NC-17 rating from the Motion Picture Association of America. Sony Pictures Classics attempted to appeal the rating to R, but the original rating was upheld. An edited R-rated version was released alongside the unedited NC-17 cut.

In response to the MPAA's decision, Nicholas released an official statement detailing his experience with their Appeals Board:

Reception
Broken English received generally positive reviews, currently holding an 82% 'fresh' rating on Rotten Tomatoes based on 17 reviews, with a weighted average of 6.83/10.

References

External links
 
 
 

1996 films
1996 romantic drama films
1990s English-language films
1990s Croatian-language films
Māori-language films
1990s Japanese-language films
Films set in Auckland
Films shot in New Zealand
New Zealand independent films
Sony Pictures Classics films
1996 independent films
1996 multilingual films
New Zealand multilingual films
New Zealand romantic drama films